As of 2012 the magazine sector in Austria was under the dominance of Germany. This influence decreased at the end of the 1990s, but it continued on the women's magazines and fashion magazines. However, business magazines have not been subject to the dominance of Germany. The major fields of Austrian magazines are news, popular science and special interest topics. On the other hand, since the Austrian press market is divided between magazines and newspapers, magazines have a significant function in the press market.

As of 2005 Austrian media company NEWS was dominating the magazine sector in the country.

The following is an incomplete list of current and defunct magazines published in Austria. They may be published in German or in other languages.

A

 Aljadidah
 Allgemeine Bauzeitung
 An.Schlaege
 Die Aula
 Auto Touring

B
 Biber
 Boarder's Buddy

C
 CD Austria

D
 Datum
 Dérive

E
 Echo

F

 Falter
 Female Sequences
 Format
 FORVM
 Die Frau
 Freie Fahrt

G

 GamingXP
 Gangway
 Die Ganze Woche
 Gewinn
 Global Player
 Gusto

H
 Der Humorist

K
 Der Kampf
 Kikeriki

L
 Literatur und Kritik
 L'Officiel Austria
 Lürzer's Archive

M
 Metropole – Vienna in English

N
 Neues Frauenleben
 NEWS

O
 Ostara
 Der Österreichische Volkswirt
 Österreichische Musikzeitschrift

P
 Patent Information News
 Poetry Salzburg Review
 Profil

R
 The Red Bulletin
 Resident

S
 Schreibkraft
 Südwind magazine
 Skug – Journal für Musik

T

 Top One
 Trend
 TV Woche

U
 Universum
 Die Unzufriedene

V
 Ver Sacrum

W

Weg und Ziel
 Wespennest
 Wiener
 Wiener Tagebuch
 Wiener Theaterzeitung
 Wochenpresse

See also
 List of newspapers in Austria

References

Austria
Magazines